Rodney Earland Paavola (August 21, 1939 – December 3, 1995) was an American ice hockey player. 

Paavola was of Finnish descent. He played football in high school for the Hancock Bulldogs. He won a gold medal at the 1960 Winter Olympics as a member of the US Olympic Ice Hockey Team.

References

External links
 
 bio

1939 births
1995 deaths
American men's ice hockey defensemen
American people of Finnish descent
Ice hockey players from Michigan
Ice hockey players at the 1960 Winter Olympics
Medalists at the 1960 Winter Olympics
Olympic gold medalists for the United States in ice hockey
People from Hancock, Michigan